Bafwasende is a town in the Tshopo Province of the Democratic Republic of the Congo. It lies on the Lindi River.

External links
Maplandia World Gazetteer
Photo

Populated places in Tshopo